Khanapur-M-Narendra is a village in Dharwad district of Karnataka, India.

Demographics 
As of the 2011 Census of India there were 130 households in Khanapur-M-Narendra and a total population of 676 consisting of 351 males and 325 females. There were 87 children ages 0-6.

References

Villages in Dharwad district